Chang Po-ling (April 5, 1876 – February 23, 1951) was a Chinese educator who, with Yan Xiu, founded Nankai University and the Nankai system of schools.

Biography

Chang Po-ling was born in Tianjin in 1876 during the last years of the Qing Dynasty. His younger brother was P.C. Chang, a philosopher and diplomat. He graduated from the Beiyang Naval Academy in 1894. He was a cadet officer in the Beiyang Fleet, but he abandoned his training after the fleet was destroyed during the First Sino-Japanese War. He attended and graduated from Saint John's University in Shanghai.

After several years of teaching, Chang Po-ling organized funding for a private college preparatory school, Nankai High School, in Tianjin in 1904. In 1917 he briefly studied at Teachers College, Columbia University in the United States, where he was influenced by the American educator and reformer John Dewey.  Afterwards, he expanded his school into a full university, Nankai University, in 1919. Under Chang's leadership, Nankai continued to expand for the next few years and became one of the most prestigious universities in China.

In 1935, during an opening ceremony in Nankai University, Chang famously posed 3 questions which would later be known as the "Three Patriotic Questions 爱国三问", the reciting of which remains a university tradition during ceremonies.

He was noted for his emphasis on athletics, which he believed would rid China of its image as the 'Sick man of Asia' in the early 1900s, quoting that 'only a good sportsman can be a good teacher'.  He established a number of annual national athletic meets and the forerunner to the modern Chinese Olympic Committee.  He established several smaller institutions, including a girls middle school (1923), experimental primary school (1928), institute of economics (1927), and of chemistry (1932).

During the 1930s, Chang Po-ling anticipated the possibility of war with Japan and made preparations to evacuate Nankai University and Nankai High School from Tianjin to the Chinese interior.  As part of these preparations, he founded the Chongqing Nankai Middle School in 1936.  When the Second Sino-Japanese War began on July 7, 1937, Chang Po-ling evacuated the entire Nankai system of schools to Changsha, Hunan.

As the Japanese military advanced towards the Chinese interior, Chang Po-ling organized a second evacuation to Kunming, Yunnan in 1938.

In 1941, Zhang Boyu joined the Kuomintang and introduced the people as Jiang Zhongzheng.

In Kunming, Nankai University joined with Peking University and Tsinghua University to form the National Southwestern Associated University, which continued to educate the top students in China until the war ended in 1945.  Afterwards, Nankai University returned to Tianjin.

June 4, 1946，Columbia University presented Chang Po-ling with the degree of Doctor Emeritus at its 192nd Commencement.

On January 29, 1947, the president of the University of California wrote to Chang Po-ling, proposing to award him the degree of honorary doctor of law. On August 28, the UNESCO China Commission was established, with Chang Po-ling as a member.

In June 1948, Jiang Zhongzheng nominated Chang Po-ling as the president of the Examination Yuan，The Control Yuan voted to agree，In July 1948, Chang Po-ling took office in Nanjing. Due to the regulations of the then Ministry of Education (Taiwan), the president of a state university could not hold a part-time job at the same time，But Chang Po-ling is unwilling to leave the cause of his life. To retain the position of the principal, In September 1948, Tianjin Mayor Du Jian will hired Chang Po-ling as a national Nankai University honorary principal, and Franklin Ho as the agent principal，and informed Chiang Kai-shek. On October 20, the executive officially released an order of Chang Po-ling resigned, and Franklin Ho was as New principal of Nankai, and did not transfer Chang Po-ling to his honorary principal. Franklin Ho wrote to the Ministry of Education (Taiwan), but not responded. At the end of the same year, Chang Po-ling left the Nanjing Examinations Institute on the pretext that she was weak and needed rest, and went back to live in Chongqing.

In 1949, when the regime was changing in mainland China, both Kuomintang and the Communist Party were trying to win over Chang Po-ling because of her high social prestige. The Kuomintang hopes that Zhang Boyu leaves the mainland, goes to Taiwan or the United States, and promises to agree with any conditions, But Zhang Boling refused with the words "I don't want to leave Nankai School, leave my motherland".

After Chang Po-ling refused Chiang Kai-shek's invitation to Taiwan and stayed in mainland China, he began to get a cold shoulder politically. Because of the protection of Zhou Enlai, Chang Po-ling was not liquidated and tried like other former military and political officials. In November, the Chinese People's Liberation Army moved into Chongqing, and the regime in Chongqing changed. In December, Chang Po-ling verified property, donated the private Chongqing Nankai Middle School, Primary School, and Kindergarten to the Chongqing Military Control Committee, and the Nankai University in Tianjin and other south series of schools also returned to the state.

In the summer of 1950, Chang Po-ling hopes to return to Tianjin to Nankai University to live, specially solicited the Opinions of the Party Branch of Nankai University, but have not received any reply.

On September 15, Chang Po-ling left for Tianjin. Zhou Enlai gave her a farewell dinner at the West Flower Hall in Zhongnanhai the day before her departure. Zhou said: "When I am in Europe, some people persuade the old gentleman, don't help Zhou Enlai, he participated in the Communist Party, but he said, Everyone has their own choice. He is the officer of the Qing Dynasty, can say this, I am very grateful. "Zhou Enlai learned that Chang Po-ling is returned to Tianjin, it may be stressed by the Tianjin authorities, and immediately said that the letter will inform Tianjin Municipal Government.

After returning to Tianjin, Chang Po-ling's family has first lived in Nanhai Road and Ningjia Building. While on Nanhai Road, he was monitored by the Tianjin police, who were not removed until Zhou Enlai's letter arrived.

Family 
Chang Po-ling's grandfather Chang Qian (张虔) was a student at the Imperial College (Beijing). He developed mental issues after failing multiple times to graduate and died at 38. Chang Po-ling's father Chang Yungae (张云藻) (courtesy name Jiuan 久庵) was an only child. He failed the imperial exam when he was young, but had a passion for music and mounted archery. Under a famous musician hired by his family, he was able to master different kinds of instrument. He was particularly talented at playing the lute, which earned him the nickname "Lute Chang" among people in Tianjin. Unfortunately, Chang's father's family wealth declined and he resorted to teaching at several private schools to support himself. When Chang's father was young, he married a woman surnamed Wu (胡). Wu died and Chang's father married another woman surnamed Yeung (杨). When Chang's father was 43, Chang was born.

Chang's brother Peng Chun Chang (张彭春) (courtesy name Zhongshu 仲述) was a representative for the Republic of China at the United Nations and had taught at Nankai University, Tsinghua University and Columbia University in the City of New York.

In 1895, Chang Po-ling married a woman surnamed Ang (安) from Yixingfu (宜兴埠), but she died of pulmonary tuberculosis five days after the wedding. The next year, Chang married Wang Shuzhen (王淑贞), who was usually referred to as Mrs. Wang. The two had seven sons and one daughter, but only four sons survived to adulthood. Four of his sons died during the Second Sino-Japanese War, and the remaining three were persecuted during the Cultural Revolution. Chang once said, "Though the universities I set up are privately owned, they are not profit-seeking organizations. Passing on one's values is more important than passing on one's wealth." This became the guiding principle for the Chang family.

Chang Po-ling's eldest son Chang Xilu (张希陆) (birth name Chang Xilu 张锡禄) (Note both names have similar pronunciation in Chinese, hence the same Romanized name) was born in 1901 and was a mathematician. During the Cultural Revolution, he was persecuted and suffered tremendous mental and physical harm, leading to him being bed-ridden near the end of his life. He died in 1988. Chang's second son Chang Xiyang (张锡羊) was born in 1907. He was a businessman and also died of persecution during the Cultural Revolution. Chang's third son Chang Xizuo (张锡祚) was born in 1908. He was an accountant and suffered the same fate as his older brothers during the Cultural Revolution, dying in 1976. Chang's fourth son Chang Xihu (张锡祜) was born in 1913. He was an athlete. He died serving his country in 1937 when the bomber he was piloting crashed in Nanchang, Jiangxi Province while on its way to bomb the Japanese cruiser Izumo.

Chang's oldest grandson Chang Yuanlong (张元龙) was born in 1948 to his third son Chang Xizuo (张锡祚). Chang Yuanlong (张元龙) once served as a member of the 11th and 12th National Committee of Chinese People's Political Consultative Conference, Vice-president of All-China Federation of Industry and Commerce, Vice-president of the National People's Committee in Tianjin, and President of All-China Federation of Industry and Commerce in Tianjin. Chang Po-ling's granddaughter Chang Yuanzhen (张媛贞) once served in the National People's Committee, the Revolutionary Central Committee and the Revolutionary Jiangsu Committee. She also once served as the Vice-secretary of Jiangsu Province's Committee of Chinese People's Political Consultative Conference and as a professor in the School of Life Sciences in Nanjing University. Chang Yuanzhen (张媛贞) died of an illness in Nanjing on January 8, 2020.

Death and remembrance

Death and obituary 
On February 14, 1951 (January 9 in the Chinese Lunar Calendar), Lu Muzhai's (卢木斋) son Lu Kaiyuan (卢开源) visited Chang Po-ling and informed him that Beijing was planning to appoint him as Vice Chairperson of the Chinese People's Political Consultative Conference. Elated about his appointment, Chang personally walked Lu off his residence. At that time, it was freezing. The same night, Chang suffered a stroke, dying on February 23 at 75 years of age. When Chang was on the verge of dying, President of the Student Union of Nankai University Yan Ziheng (閻子亨) suggested writing Chang's obituary on his behalf. Recommended by everyone for the job was Huang Yusheng (黄钰生). After the draft was completed, it was edited by Zhang Qingchang (張清常), Professor of Chinese at Nankai University. Quoted below is a translation of Chang's obituary: 
 In the year 1897, I was indignant at the humiliation of my country by Imperial Powers. Inspired by Yan Xiu (嚴修), I dedicated myself to education. For over 50 years, my dedication never flinched, but much remains to be done to promote moral values and patriotism as well as nurture talents in science and medicine. My students and I have been working to achieve those goals, encouraging each other in the process. Now under the leadership of the People's Government, my students will continue my work. The education institutions I dedicated my life to – Nankai University, Nankai High School and Chongqing Nankai Secondary School – will actively seek to reform themselves and develop rapidly. Today's People's Government has brought an unprecedented level of corruption-free, good governance to China. Its development of the manufacturing industry and pursuit of a friendly relationship with the Soviet Union suggest the People's Government is far-sighted and competent. My dear students, please do your utmost, be united, serve your people and your country, and support the People's Government in building a strong, prosperous new China. Our country has a bright future, a future I am looking forward to. My dear students, please strive towards that goal.

Official memorial service in mainland China 
On February 24, 1951, Zhou Enlai (周恩来) went to Tianjin to attend a military meeting by the 20th Corps of the People's Volunteer Army. Once he arrived in Tianjin, he went to Chang's home to send his condolences and to deliver wreaths to pay his respects for Chang. On the ribbon, he wrote "Teacher Chang, may your teachings be passed down forever! Your student Zhou Enlai (周恩来) is here to pay his respects." On February 26, the Tianjin Daily posted a brief article that began with the title  "Former President of Nankai University. Chang Po-ling Dies of Illness, His Obituary Stating that his Students should Continue to Support the People's Government". During the decades after his passing, Chang was virtually unmentioned by mainland Chinese newspapers. After Chang's death, Zhou Enlai (周恩来), an alumnus of Nankai University and the then Premier of the People's Republic of China, personally sent his condolences to Chang's family. Commenting on Chang, Zhou said during the memorial service, "A person should be judged based on the historical background and situation in his time, and we should not judge a person from the past by today's standards. President Chang was progressive and patriotic when he was alive, and his commitment to education has benefited the people. The People's Government was very concerned about him when he was sick and hoped that he would recover soon. Unfortunately, he passed away suddenly." Due to the political environment at the time of Chang's passing, most people were afraid of the political repercussions and remained silent throughout the memorial service.

Official memorial service in Taiwan 
At that time, Taiwan also showed condolences for Chang's death. Another version of Chang's written obituary was circuiting on the island, but it was proven to have been falsified by Chang's eldest son, Chang Xilu (张希陆). On February 27, 1951, after learning of Chang's death, Chiang Chung-cheng (蔣中正) wrote in his memoir that words could not describe how sad he was about it. On March 31 the same year, organizations such as the Nankai University Taiwanese Student Association and the Chinese Kuomintang Reform Commission held a grand memorial service. Chiang Chung-cheng (蔣中正) presided over the ceremony and wrote the elegiac couplet "守正不屈，多士所宗" (Back translation: A man of uncompromising values, values people should follow). Attending the ceremony were Chang's close friends including Wang Chonghui (王寵惠), Chen Cheng (陳誠), Wang Shijie (王世杰), Zhang Lisheng (張厲生) and Zhang Jia (章嘉).

Unofficial memorial services in mainland China 
Unlike Taiwan, which held a grand memorial service for Chang, Tianjin Nankai Girls' High School held a small one in its hall. There was not a sad vibe in it, and few attended the event. Because the event was not advertised to the wider public, very few knew of it. The small memorial service began with Nankai University Professor Situ Yuelan (司徒月兰) playing the piano. Alumni and Yan Ziheng (阎子亨), the organizer of the memorial service, read aloud Chang's obituary. A memorial speech was given by Huang Yusheng (黄钰生), and Yu Chuanjian (喻传鉴), Li Zhuchen (李烛尘), Vice President of Chinese Academy of Sciences Tao Menghe (陶孟和) and Yang Shixian (杨石先) also took turns to give their speeches to remember Chang. A year later, Yu Chuanjian (喻传鉴) presided over another memorial service for Chang in Chongqing, but attendance was also low.

Burial Site 
As Chang wished to be buried on the campus of Nankai University, some attendees started discussing this issue after the small memorial service held by Tianjin Nankai Girls' High School. The Communist Party Committee of Nankai University suggested that Chang should not be buried there, justifying this with the lack of a close relationship between students of Nankai University and Chang around the time of his death and also with the students' belief that the university belonged to the Chinese people, not Chang alone. Because of that suggestion, Chang was buried instead in Tianjin Wujiakiln District Permanent Cemetery. Later, because the same site was rezoned, his grave was moved to Tianjin Eastern Suburb Yeung Family Cemetery. In 1962, Chang's wife died, and the two were buried in Tianjin Beicang First Public Cemetery. In 1975, the two's bodies were cremated, and their ashes were placed in the Beijing home of their eldest son Chang Xilu (张希陆). In 1979, an interment of ashes ceremony was held in Tianjin Water Park Martyrs Cemetery, after which Chang's ashes were placed there. Later, his ashes were moved to Beicang Martyrs Cemetery. Finally, the government again commended Chang for his contributions, and on October 16, 1989, Chang's and his wife's ashes were interred under Chang's bronze statue in the yard of Nankai University.

Annual memorial services 
After China reformed and opened up, the political situation stabilized and discussions of Chang became less of a taboo in mainland China. The loss of political sensitivity around the topic led to increasingly more public remembrance of Chang and studies of his life. Studies of his life became increasingly popular, and has become one of the hot topics in research in modern education. Currently, Nankai University holds an annual memorial service for Chang on the eve of Ching Ming Festival.

Evaluation 
After Chang Po-ling died, The two sides of the strait are very different from his evaluation because he was serviced by the government of the Republic of China. In Taiwan, Nankai alumni who moved to Taiwan with the government of the Republic of China commemorated Chang Po-ling's achievements in running the school with commemorative anthologies, memorials, biographies, and monographs, and held commemorative activities birthday every ten years of Chang Po-ling；In mainland China, Chang Po-ling 's name was once taboo before the country's reform and opening up. With the continuous political movement in mainland China, the criticism of Chang Po-ling from various departments of Nankai University has become increasingly vocal. Moreover, teachers in Nankai University were asked to express their opinions one by one, The "discordant voice" of the old staff in Nankai who had worked with Chang Po-ling，against criticism at Chang Po-ling was also drowned. In 1960, the History of Nankai University, which was published by Nankai University, totally denied Chang Po-ling. Until the 1980s, after the reform and opening up, the Chinese mainland officials reappraised and affirmed Chang Po-ling, and the evaluation of Zhang Boling on both sides of the Taiwan Straits tended to be consistent:Zhang Bo is not only the banner of Nankai but also a very unique success in the field of modern education in China.

Removing Zhangboling 

In the early 1950s, private Tianjin Nankai Middle School, private Tianjin Nankai Girls' High School, and private Chongqing Nankai Middle School were all taken over by the government and renamed as Tianjin No. 15 High School, Tianjin No. 7 Girls' High School and Chongqing No. 3 High School respectively.The number sequence of the school name replaced the original "Nankai" school name. There is no trace of Chang Po-ling in a series of schools in Nankai. The school song of Nankai, the school color of blue lotus and purple, the school motto, and Chang Po-ling once became the symbol of "old Nankai", which was deliberately diluted. Chang Po-ling is no longer mentioned in the history of Nankai School. Only Yan Xiu founded Nankai School.

In 1952, through the adjusted Nankai University, Nankai University held a meeting，It violates Chang Po-ling's plan to build a comprehensive university with four disciplines of liberal arts, science, engineering, and business，It has shrunk into liberal art and science university with only 9 departments of mathematics, physics, chemistry, biology, philosophy, Chinese, history, foreign languages, and economics.

During the Cultural Revolution, the Red Guard took the cemetery of Chang Po-ling, smashed the tombstone. Descendants sorted out the bones and cremate them, left the ashes in a closet at home."My grandparents died and had no place to be buried since then," laments Chang Po-ling, granddaughter of Chang Po-ling, a former member of the CPPCC Standing Committee.

Memorial statues and buildings 
Nankai University, Tianjin Nankai Middle School, Chongqing Nankai Middle School, National Southwest Associated University site and other campuses have set up statues of Chang Po-ling to commemorate. Nankai University and Nankai Middle School both have buildings named by Chang Po-ling. In 1999, Po-ling Building was built on the campus of Nankai University. Tianjin Nankai Middle School was renamed its Po-ling Building, which was built in 1906, East Building.

In October 2004, three bronze statues of Yan Xiu, Chang Po-ling, and Zhou Enlai were built in the Xiangyu Park in front of Nankai Middle School in Tianjin.

On October 16, 2013, two bronze statues of Yan Xiu and Chang Po-ling were completed in the campus of Nankai Middle School in Tianjin, which were donated by alumni.

In addition, MingDao University in Taiwan named its administrative center Po-ling Building because Chang Po-ling was regarded as an exemplar of educators who were committed to lifelong dedication.

Literature 
In August 2005, the TV series " Chang Po-ling" broadcast in China CCTV. In 2017, the historical and humanistic documentary "There was a School named Nankai" was broadcast on CCTV and Tianjin TV successively.

References

Further reading 
Fairbank, John King.  The Great Chinese Revolution: 1800–1985.  New York:  Harper & Row, 1986.

1876 births
1951 deaths
Chinese Christians
Educators from Tianjin
Presidents of Nankai University
Presidents of the Examination Yuan
Republic of China politicians from Tianjin
Academic staff of Nankai University
St. John's University, Shanghai alumni
Recipients of the Order of Brilliant Star
Teachers College, Columbia University alumni
Academic staff of the National Southwestern Associated University
Beiyang Fleet personnel